Stemorrhages is a genus of moths of the family Crambidae described by Julius Lederer in 1863. Members of the moth genus Palpita may be very similar.

Species
Stemorrhages amphitritalis (Guenée, 1854)
Stemorrhages euthalassa (Meyrick, 1934)
Stemorrhages exaula (Meyrick, 1888)
Stemorrhages marthesiusalis (Walker, 1859)
Stemorrhages oceanitis (Meyrick, 1886)
Stemorrhages sericea (Drury, 1773)
Stemorrhages thetydalis (Guenée, 1854)
Stemorrhages titanicalis (Hampson, 1918)

Former species
Stemorrhages costata (Fabricius, 1794)

References

Spilomelinae
Crambidae genera
Taxa named by Julius Lederer